This is a list of people removed from the Privy Council of England, of Ireland, of Great Britain, and of the United Kingdom.

Membership of a Privy Council, once given, normally lasts for life, but it is possible for Privy Counsellors to be expelled from membership and for them to ask to be removed.

References

Lists of Privy Counsellors